Yoshinoya Irokuen (Japanese: よしのや依緑園) is a traditional Japanese ryokan (inn) established in 1192, the second oldest (after Shirasagiyu Tawaraya) in Yamanaka Onsen town, part of Kaga city in Ishikawa Prefecture, Japan.

Yamanaka Onsen is a well-known hot spring in the Kakusenkei valley surrounded by mountains, with a long history and folk culture. Local baths contains calcium-sodium sulfate water and can help with diseases:

Neuralgia
Muscle pain
Arthralgia
Frozen shoulder
Joint stiffness
Hemorrhoids
Coldness
Recovery from fatigue
Arteriosclerosis
Burns
Chronic skin disease, etc.

See also 
Onsen
List of oldest companies

References

External links 
Homepage in Japanese
Location on Google Maps

1190s establishments in Japan
Hotels in Ishikawa Prefecture